Innocenzo is a male given name of Latin origin. Notable people with this name include:

Innocenzo da Berzo (1844–1890), Roman Catholic priest
Innocenzo Bonelli, Captain Regent of San Marino
Innocenzo Del Bufalo-Cancellieri (1566–1610), Roman Catholic cardinal
Innocenzo Chatrian (1927–2019), Italian cross-country skier
Innocenzo Ciocchi Del Monte (–1577), Roman Catholic cardinal
Giovanni Battista Innocenzo Colombo (1717–1801), Swiss painter and architect
Innocenzo Conti (1731–1785), Roman Catholic cardinal
Innocenzo Cybo (1491–1550), Roman Catholic cardinal
Innocenzo Donina (1950–2020), Italian footballer
Innocenzo Ferrieri (1810–1887), Roman Catholic cardinal
Innocenzo Fraccaroli (1805–1882), Italian sculptor
Innocenzo di Pietro Francucci da Imola, Italian painter
Carlo Innocenzo Frugoni (1692–1768), Italian poet
Innocenzo Leonelli (1592–1625), Italian soldier
Innocenzo Manzetti (1826–1877), Italian inventor
Giovanni Innocenzo Martinelli (1942–2019), Roman Catholic prelate
Innocenzo Migliavacca (1635–1714), Roman Catholic prelate
Flaminio Innocenzo Minozzi (1735–1817), Italian painter
Innocenzo Spinazzi (1726–1798), Italian sculptor

See also
Damiano and Fabio D'Innocenzo, a pair of Italian film directors
Innocenzo Gasparini Institute for Economic Research, a research center of Bocconi University

References

Italian given names